Dowlatabad (also Romanized as Dowlatābād) is a village in Kharqan Rural District, Bastam District, Shahrud County, Semnan Province, Iran. At the 2006 census, its population was 24, in 10 families.

References 

Populated places in Shahrud County